The Pseudomonas rnk leader is a putative attenuator element identified by bioinformatics within bacteria of the γ-proteobacterial Pseudomonas genus. It is located upstream of the rnk gene, encoding a  nucleoside diphosphate kinase regulator, and presents a Rho-independent terminator at the 3' end. This RNA is presumed to operate as a non-coding leader, which regulatory mechanism remains to be elucidated. The motif might be related to other rnk-and greA-leaders, such the Enterobacteria rnk leader and Enterobacteria greA leader.

See also 
Pseudomonas rpsL leader

References

External links 

Cis-regulatory RNA elements